Jerry Douglas Henderson (June 22, 1941 – May 17, 2014) was a men's and women's basketball coach. He served as the head coach of the Mississippi State Bulldogs women's basketball team from 1989 through 1995, compiling a career record of 62–101.

Henderson attended Mississippi State University on a basketball scholarship and later served in the Mississippi Air National Guard. He died of cancer in 2014.

Head coaching record

References

American men's basketball players
American women's basketball coaches
Mississippi State Bulldogs women's basketball coaches
Mississippi State Bulldogs men's basketball players
1941 births
2014 deaths